Andrea Lanzl (born 8 October 1987) is a German ice hockey player for ERC Ingolstadt and the German national team. In February 2020, she surpassed Udo Kiessling to become the all-time leader in international appearances among German national team players (both male and female).

She participated at the 2015 IIHF Women's World Championship.

International career
Lanzl was selected for the Germany women's national ice hockey team in the 2006 and 2014 Winter Olympics. In 2006, she did not record a point in five games. In 2014, she recorded one assist.

Lanzl also played for Germany in the qualifying event for the 2014 Winter Olympics, and the 2010 Olympics

As of 2014, Lanzl has also appeared for Germany at seven IIHF Women's World Championships. Her first appearance came in 2005.

Career statistics
Through 2013–14 season

References

External links
 
 
 
 

1987 births
Living people
Ice hockey players at the 2006 Winter Olympics
Ice hockey players at the 2014 Winter Olympics
Olympic ice hockey players of Germany
People from Starnberg
Sportspeople from Upper Bavaria
German women's ice hockey forwards
German expatriate ice hockey people
German expatriate sportspeople in Sweden
Linköping HC Dam players